Connect is a 2022 Tamil-language Supernatural horror film directed by Ashwin Saravanan and produced by Vignesh Shivan under Rowdy Pictures, starring Nayanthara, Sathyaraj, Anupam Kher, and Vinay Rai. Connect marks the second collaboration of Saravanan with Nayanthara, after Maya. The background score was composed by Prithvi Chandrasekhar. The film also marks Kher’s return to Tamil cinema after a long gap.

Plot 
During the nationwide lockdown in India, Susan, a single mother starts noticing eerie changes in the behaviour of her daughter, after her father’s death, gets virtual help of Father Augustine, a priest, who proposes a virtual exorcism.

Cast 
 Nayanthara as Susan
 Sathyaraj as Arthur Samuel, Susan's father
 Anupam Kher as Father Augustine
 Vinay Rai as Dr.Joseph Benoy, Susan's late husband, (Cameo appearance)
 Haniya Nafisa as Anna Joseph (Ammu), Susan and Joseph's daughter
 Avinash as Father Alex
 Mekha Rajan as Ouija Board practitioner
 Maala Parvathi as Healthcare Worker
 Lizzie Antony as Lizzy

Production

Development 
In a conversation with Silverscreen India, Ashwin Saravanan stated that: "I was feeling stressed and anxious; the times were very uncertain. There was hopelessness and uncertainty about whether we would ever recover from it. I wanted to portray those emotions in a film and I realised the only genre that would work for my purpose was horror. Anxiety, dread, sense of hopelessness and fear – the horror genre lends itself to these emotions beautifully. We chose the title Connect because, during the lockdown, all of us found it hard to connect with those around us. I want to capture that in the film. What happens when we are unable to connect, is one of layers that we have explored." The story is written by Ashwin in association with his wife Kaavya Ramkumar, marking their second collaboration after Game Over.

Filming 
The filming began in October 2021 and schedules were canned continuously in Chennai, Tamil Nadu. The makers unveiled the first look poster of the film on Nayanthara’s birthday, November 18, 2021. The principal photography has been completed in mid 2022.

Release

Theatrical 
The makers announced the release date of the film as December 22, 2022 with a jump-scary teaser and also the film will not have an intermission. However, after theatre owners in Tamil Nadu refused to screen films without intermissions, citing potential loss of revenue, the makers of Connect agreed to give theatres an option to induce intermissions. The trailer of the film was released on 9 December 2022. Ahimsa Entertainment released the film overseas in the UK and Europe.

Home media 
The post-theatrical streaming rights of the film has been sold to Netflix.

Reception
The film received mixed reviews from critics.

Logesh Balachandran of The Times of India gave the film 2.5 out of 5 stars and wrote "Nayanthara, once again, delivers a convincing act as the mother of a depressed teenager. The technical aspects of the film are brilliant, especially the sound design (Sachin Sudhakaran and Hariharan) and cinematography." Latha Srinivasan of India Today gave the film 3 out of 5 stars and wrote "Produced by Rowdy Pictures, Connect is a film that belongs to Haniya Nafisa and the audience will remember her for a long time to come." Haricharan Pudipeddi of Hindustan Times wrote "The music and cinematography play a very key role in making Connect an exceptionally good cinematic experience." Arvind V of Pinkvilla gave the film’s rating 2.5 out of 5 and wrote "The narrative is satisfied with its spiritual convictions, giving the drama a raw deal." Srivatsan S of The Hindu wrote "For someone whose resume includes the stunning Game Over, you would ideally expect Ashwin to push the genre constraints. Connect is him settling for the ordinary." Thinkal Menon of OTT Play gave the film’s rating 3 out of 5 stars and wrote "The performances of lead actors save this run-of-the-mill horror film which has nothing new to offer in terms of story." A critic for India Herald gave a rating of 3 stars for the film and wrote "Overall, Connect is a story that might make you think of a lot of hollywood horror movies, but the superb sound and jump scares will mesmerise you in the theatre." Kirubhakar Purushothaman of The Indian Express gave the film 3 out of 5 stars and wrote "Again, it is pretty amusing that of all kinds of Tamil mainstream cinema, a true-blue genre has represented the ones that are still grieving." Vishal Menon of Film Companion wrote "It's a familiar story told in an unfamiliar way and when the making-style contributes, you feel fear like vou haven't yet before. But when it doesn't, it's the boredom of
ghosts past that get to you first." Lakshmi Subramanian of The Week gave the film’s rating 3 out of 5 and wrote "With the film revolving around the three characters, in the backdrop of the lockdown, 99 minutes might seem long." Ashwin Ram of Moviecrow gave the film’s rating 2.5 out of 5 and wrote "A technically rich film with an unique approach style. But the core essence is extremely disappointing as there’s nothing to specify as a story. Also, the happenings are as familiar as it can be for a horror movie." Avinash Ramachandran of Cinema Express gave the film 2.5 out of 5 stars and wrote, "Connect starts strongly with a bright tale freefalling into the depths of darkness, courtesy of the pandemic, the film sparingly hits the high notes of the genre while just about managing past the finish line."

References

External links 
 

2022 horror films
2020s Tamil-language films
2022 films
Indian horror thriller films
Films postponed due to the COVID-19 pandemic